The discography of Angus Stone, an Australian folk singer-songwriter, consists of five studio albums, one EPs and seventeen singles. Stone has release music under the pseudonyms Lady of the Sunshine and Dope Lemon.

Stone also performs with sister Julia as the duo, Angus & Julia Stone.

Albums

Studio albums

Extended plays

Singles

Guest appearances

See also
 Angus and Julia Stone

References

Discographies of Australian artists
Folk music discographies
Rhythm and blues discographies